The Online News Association (ONA), founded in 1999, is a 501(c)(3) non-profit organization located in Washington D.C., United States. It is the world's largest association of digital journalists, with more than 2,000 members.

The majority of ONA members are professional online journalists. The association defines "professional members" as those "whose principal livelihood involves gathering or producing news for digital presentation." These include news writers, producers, programmers, bloggers, designers, editors, photographers and others who produce news for the Internet or other digital delivery systems. Other members include journalism educators, journalism students, business development, marketing and communications professionals in the media and those interested in the field of online journalism.

Online Journalism Awards (OJAs) 
The Online News Association administers the Online Journalism Awards, the only awards honoring excellence in digital journalism. The OJAs focus on independent, community, nonprofit, major media and international news sites. Ten awards now come with a total of $60,000 in prize money, courtesy of the Gannett Foundation and the John S. and James L. Knight Foundation. The awards were launched in May 2000 as a joint effort of the Online News Association and the Columbia University Graduate School of Journalism. Winners are announced at the annual conference.

Online News Association Conference & Awards Banquet 
The organization holds an annual conference and awards banquet in the U.S., the Online News Association Conference & Awards Banquet, which features three days of training, leading media keynotes and a Career Summit & Job Fair. Past keynote speakers include: Twitter's Evan Williams; Vivek Kundra, Chief Information Officer of the United States in the Obama administration; AOL CEO Tim Page; then-NPR CEO Vivian Schiller, and journalists instrumental in the Arab Spring uprising. Since 2015, it has also held a shorter conference in Europe.

MJ Bear Fellowship 
Starting in 2011, MJ Bear Fellowships have been awarded to three promising journalists under the age of 30. The fellowships "identify and celebrate young digital journalists, working independently or for a company or organization, who have demonstrated — through professional experimentation, research or other projects — that they deserve support for their efforts and/or vision." The first fellowships were awarded for the 2011-12 academic year.

The 2016 MJ Bear Fellows:
Alex Laughlin, News Audio Fellow, BuzzFeed
Rose Eveleth, Producer, 30 for 30 Podcasts, ESPN
Sohara Mehroze Shachi, Programme Associate, United Nations Development Programme

The 2015 MJ Bear Fellows:
Keron Bascombe, Freelancer Writer/Blogger, Trinidad and Tobago
Nadia Tamez-Robledo, Communication Specialist, Texas Nurses Association, Austin, TX
Ariana Tobin, Engagement Reporter, ProPublica, New York City, NY

The 2014 MJ Bear Fellows:
Anika Anand, Director of Engagement at Chalkbeat, an education news network
Rajneesh Bhandari, Independent Multimedia Journalist
Aaron Williams, News Applications Developer, Center for Investigative Reporting (CIR)

The 2013 MJ Bear Fellows:
Armie Garde, assistant content editor, multimedia journalist, Sun.Star Publishing, Cebu City, Philippines
Ashley Lohmann, freelance journalist and associate editor, Fair Observer, San Francisco
Kyle Stokes, reporter, StateImpact Indiana, a collaboration of WFIU and Indiana Public Broadcasting

The 2012 MJ Bear Fellows: 
Hagit Bachrach, video producer at the Council on Foreign Relations
Tricia Fulks, freelance digital journalist; founding story director of "Hollow" interactive documentary
Denise Hassanzade Ajiri, web writer for Web writer for Radio Farda, Radio Free Europe.

The 2011 MJ Bear Fellows:
Lucas Timmons, a data journalist and web producer for The Edmonton Journal
Laura Amico, the founder and editor of Homicide Watch in Washington, D.C
Lam Thuy Vo, formerly multimedia reporter for The Wall Street Journal in Hong Kong, now at NPR's Planet Money.

AP Google Journalism and Technology Scholarship 

ONA administers a national scholarship program funded by the Associated Press and Google Inc. to foster digital, computer science and new media skills in student journalists. The scholarship, launched in 2011 and awarded six $20,000 scholarships to undergraduate and graduates students to apply to tuition.

References 

 
 Steve Outing, "Online News Association Forming; Interactivity, Part 2," Dec. 9, 1998, Editor & Publisher (Outdated)

External links
 

Journalism-related professional associations
American online journalism
501(c)(3) organizations